Millard Mitchell (August 14, 1903 – October 13, 1953) was an American character actor whose credits include roughly 30 feature films and two television appearances.

He appeared as a bit player in eight films between 1931 and 1936. Mitchell returned to film work in 1942 after a six-year absence. Between 1942 and 1953, he was a successful supporting actor.

For his performance in the film My Six Convicts (1952), Mitchell won the Golden Globe Award for Best Supporting Actor – Motion Picture. He is also remembered for his role as Col. Rufus Plummer in Billy Wilder's A Foreign Affair (1948), as Gregory Peck's commanding officer in the war drama Twelve O'Clock High (1949), High-Spade Frankie Wilson in Winchester '73 (1950), as the fictional movie mogul R.F. Simpson in the musical comedy Singin' in the Rain (1952), and as a hapless old prospector in The Naked Spur (1953).

Mitchell appeared frequently on Broadway, often playing a fast-talking Broadway character. He played the starring role in The Great Campaign (1947).

Personal life
Mitchell was born to American parents in Havana, Cuba.  He married actress Peggy Gould in 1942; the couple had two daughters, Mary Ellis and Margaret. Their daughter Maggie Schpak is a noted Hollywood jewelry designer.

Mitchell died at the age of 50 in 1953 from lung cancer at St. John's Hospital in Santa Monica, California,
 and was interred in Holy Cross Cemetery in Culver City, California.

Filmography

Secrets of a Secretary (1931) - Policeman (uncredited)
My Sin (1931) - Trooper (uncredited)
A Lesson in Love (1931) - Freshman (uncredited)
The Cheat (1931) - Courtroom Spectator (uncredited)
Dynamite Delaney (1936)
Mr. and Mrs. North (1942) - Detective Mullins
Grand Central Murder (1942) - Arthur Doolin
The Mayor of 44th Street (1942) - Herman
Little Tokyo, U.S.A. (1942) - George 'Sleepy' Miles (uncredited)
The Big Street (1942) - Gentleman George (uncredited)
Get Hep to Love (1942) - McCarthy
Dixie Dugan (1943) - Accident Victim (uncredited)
Slightly Dangerous (1943) - Baldwin 
Swell Guy (1946) - Steve
Kiss of Death (1947) - Detective Shelby (uncredited)
A Double Life (1947) - Al Cooley
A Foreign Affair (1948) - Col. Rufus J. Plummer
Thieves' Highway (1949) - Ed Kinney
Everybody Does It (1949) - Mike Craig
Twelve O'Clock High (1949) - Major General Pritchard 
The Gunfighter (1950) - Marshall Mark Strett
Louisa (1950) - Photo of David Norton (uncredited)
Winchester '73 (1950) - High-Spade Frankie Wilson
Convicted (1950) - Malloby
Mister 880 (1950) - "Mac" McIntire
You're in the Navy Now (1951) - Chief George Larrabee
Strictly Dishonorable (1951) - Bill Dempsey
The Day the Earth Stood Still (1951) - General (uncredited)
My Six Convicts (1952) - James Connie
Singin' in the Rain (1952) - R. F. Simpson
The Naked Spur (1953) - Jesse Tate
Here Come the Girls (1953) - Albert Snodgrass

References

External links

 
 
 Matinee Classics: Millard Mitchell
 

1903 births
1953 deaths
American male film actors
American male television actors
Best Supporting Actor Golden Globe (film) winners
Deaths from lung cancer in California
Male Western (genre) film actors
Burials at Holy Cross Cemetery, Culver City
20th-century American male actors
Male actors from Havana
Cuban emigrants to the United States